Leo-Raymond de Neckère, C.M. (6 June 1800 – 4 September 1833), was a Belgian-born prelate of the Roman Catholic Church who served as Bishop of New Orleans from 1830 until his death in 1833.

Biography
Born in Wevelgem, West Flanders, Leo-Raymond de Neckère studied the classics and philosophy at the College of Roeselare, and attended the seminary of Ghent. He accepted an invitation from Bishop Louis DuBourg in 1817 to serve as a missionary in Louisiana, United States, arriving in September of that year. He completed his studies at St. Mary's of the Barrens Seminary in Perryville, Missouri, on the outskirts of St. Louis, and there joined the Congregation of the Mission (also known as the Lazarists or Vincentians) in 1820. De Neckère was ordained to the priesthood on 13 October 1822. He then worked as a missionary and seminary professor before becoming superior of St. Mary's Seminary in 1826.

While in Europe to recuperate his health, de Neckère was appointed the first Bishop of New Orleans by Pope Pius VIII on 4 August 1829. Returning to the United States, he received his episcopal consecration on 24 June 1830 from Bishop Joseph Rosati, C.M., with Bishops Michael Portier and John England serving as co-consecrators, at St. Louis Cathedral. He convoked a synod of the diocesan clergy in February 1832 and established New Orleans' first English-speaking parish, St. Patrick's Church, in April 1833. After an outbreak of yellow fever in 1833, de Neckère, who had retired to Convent, returned to the episcopal see of New Orleans, where he himself fell victim to the fever and soon died at age 33.

References

External links
 

1800 births
1833 deaths
People from Wevelgem
Vincentians
Belgian expatriates in the United States
Belgian Roman Catholic missionaries
Vincentian bishops
19th-century Roman Catholic bishops in the United States
19th-century Belgian Roman Catholic priests
Roman Catholic bishops of New Orleans
Deaths from yellow fever
Burials at St. Louis Cathedral (New Orleans)
Roman Catholic missionaries in the United States
Infectious disease deaths in Louisiana